USS Experiment may refer to several ships, including:

  was a schooner launched in 1799 and sold in 1801
  was a schooner launched in 1832 and sold in 1848

United States Navy ship names